The 1st FINA Synchronised Swimming World Cup was held 1979 in Tokyo, Japan. It had swimmers from eight nations, swimming in three events: solo, duet and team.

Participating nations
Eight nations swam at the 1979 Synchro World Cup:

Results

Point standings

References

FINA Synchronized Swimming World Cup
1979 in synchronized swimming
International aquatics competitions hosted by Japan
1979 in Japanese sport
Synchronized swimming competitions in Japan